Kathrine Windfeld (21 August 1966 – 6 February 2015) was a Danish film and television director. She is known for the 2012 Swedish spy film Hamilton: In the Interest of the Nation. As a television director she is credited with episodes of Wallander, The Killing, Rita and The Bridge.

Personal life 
Windfeld died on 6 February 2015 after a short illness. Windfeld suffered from a brain tumour. She was 48 years old.

Filmography

References

External links 

1966 births
2015 deaths
Danish women film directors
Danish television directors
Women television directors
Deaths from brain tumor
Deaths from cancer in Denmark 
Neurological disease deaths in Denmark
Place of death missing
People from Copenhagen